Protein mago nashi homolog is a protein that in humans is encoded by the MAGOH gene.

Drosophila that have mutations in their mago nashi (grandchildless) gene produce progeny with defects in germplasm assembly and germline development. This gene encodes the mammalian mago nashi homolog. In mammals, mRNA expression is not limited to the germ plasm, but is expressed ubiquitously in adult tissues and can be induced by serum stimulation of quiescent fibroblasts.

Interactions
MAGOH has been shown to interact with RBM8A and NXF1. In Drosophila melanogaster, Mago Nashi and Tsunagi/Y14 (core components of the exon junction complex) form a complex with a novel zinc finger protein, Ranshi, that has a role in oocyte differentiation.

References

Further reading